Walter Vesti (born 6 March 1950) is a Swiss former alpine skier. During his career he only won a single FIS Alpine Ski World Cup event, in 1975 at Megève in France.

References

External links
 fis-ski.com

1950 births
Living people
Swiss male alpine skiers